Paxton K. Baker is an American businessman, entrepreneur and philanthropist, who has served in the entertainment, music, sports and production industries for over 30 years.

Mr. Baker is a minority owner of the Washington Nationals Baseball club and currently serves as chairman of the Washington Nationals Founding Partners Group. In 2015, Baker became a partner in the ownership group of the Washington Kastles World Team Tennis League. He is also a governing board member of the Global Sports Summit.

Career 
In 2018, Baker launched the Washington, D.C., office of Liquid Soul, the agency behind the marketing and promotion of such blockbuster films as Black Panther and Wrinkle in Time.  As managing partner, Baker is leading the expansion of the 17-year-old company into the political, sports and entertainment arenas.

For 16 years, Baker served as the executive vice president and general manager of Centric (formerly BETJ), a BET network targeting African American and multicultural adults, owned by Viacom Media. Centric is a 24-hour music and entertainment network featuring the artists, music, series, movies and reality programming that reflects the lifestyle and sophistication of today's African-American and multi-cultural adult.

As the general manager of Centric, Baker led programming initiatives that continue to win numerous awards, including a local Emmy Award, a GLAAD special recognition award for “fair and inclusive” programming, a NAMIC award for the show “My Two Cents”, a NAMIC Vision Award for the series “Lens on Talent”, and multiple Telly Awards. He has also produced two Grammy nominated solo albums (BeBe Winans' “Live and Up Close” and “Cherch”).

For nearly 15 years, Baker was president of BET Event Productions, which produced music festivals, TV awards shows, specials and concerts throughout the world. While at BET, Baker produced several major award shows including the BET Experience (2014), Soul Train Awards (2009-2014), The Source Awards (2006–2007) and Billboard Jazz Awards (2001).  He also produced numerous notable and historic specials, concerts and documentaries.  In 2013, he served as the Executive Producer of the United Nations Day in conjunction with Stevie Wonder at the General Assembly Hall at United Nations Headquarters in New York, celebrating the 67th anniversary of the UN's peacekeeping and crisis management efforts around the globe. He also served as the executive producer of the Marian Anderson 75th Anniversary Celebration of Historic Concert on the Lincoln Memorial in Washington, D.C., and the 50th Anniversary Concert celebrating the historic march from Selma to Montgomery in Alabama.

In 2006 Baker was appointed chairman of the Viacom Marketing Council (2006–2012) where he led over 35 senior marketing and sales executives across all Viacom divisions, focusing on training, best practices and strengthening brand partnerships. In 2008 he co-founded the Viacom Programming Council, composed of senior programmers from BET Networks, MTV Networks and Paramount Pictures. Baker was also a member of the Viacom Corporate Responsibility Council.

Prior to joining BET, Baker was president and founder of PKB Arts & Entertainment, which was incorporated in 1988. The company produced and booked talent for the Aruba Jazz and Latin Music Festival; the Amsterdam Drum Jazz Festival; Trinidad Pan Jazz Festival; and toured acts such as Gloria Estefan, Herbie Hancock, Carlos Santana and Wynton Marsalis throughout the Caribbean, Africa, South America and Europe. PKB Arts and Entertainment was purchased by BET in April 2000, retaining Baker as president of the newly formed company, BET Event Productions. The company has produced events in the following locations: Anguilla, Barbados, Bermuda, Cayman Islands, Ghana, Jamaica, J&R Music & Computer World (New York City), Iceland, South Africa, and the Turks and Caicos Islands, as well as St. Lucia, which is celebrating the 25th anniversary of its jazz festival in 2016.

Charity/Philanthropy 
Affiliated with a number of professional, civic and cultural organizations, Mr. Baker is a member of the board of directors for the United States Senate Preservation Trust, Thelonious Monk Institute of Jazz, Washington Performing Arts, DC Public Education Fund and the Asia Jazz Festival Organization.

In 2006, Mr. Baker was appointed by the Speaker of the U.S. House of Representatives to serve as a member of The Congressional Award Foundation national board of directors, the only official charity of the United States Congress. Shortly thereafter he was elected to serve as vice chairman and then chairman of the board in 2007.

Personal life
Baker and his wife Rachel (formerly Rachel Stuart) have three children and live in Metropolitan Washington, D.C.

See also
BET
BET Her
Viacom
The Congressional Award
Washington Nationals

References

External links
http://www.bet.com/
http://www.centrictv.com/
http://congressionalaward.org/
http://www.viacom.com/Pages/default.aspx
http://washington.nationals.mlb.com/index.jsp?c_id=was
http://www.monkinstitute.org/
https://web.archive.org/web/20101122145211/http://congressionalaward.org/index.php

Year of birth missing (living people)
Living people
American television executives
American television producers